Hanley is both a surname and a given name. Notable people with the name include:

Surname
 Barbara Hanley (1882–1959), Canadian politician
 Ben Hanley (born 1985), English racing driver
 Bill Hanley (ice hockey) (1915–1990), Irish-born Canadian ice hockey administrator
 Bill Hanley (rancher) (1861–1935), American cattle baron
 Bill Hanley (sound engineer) (born 1937), American audio engineer
 Bo Hanley (1887–1980), American professional football player and coach
 Brian Hanley (born 1974), Irish hurler
 Bridget Hanley (1941–2021), American actress
 Catherine Hanley (born 1972), Australian-born British writer and medievalist
 Cliff Hanley (1922–1999), Scottish journalist, novelist, playwright and broadcaster
 Dan Hanley (footballer) (1883 – after 1913), Australian-rules footballer
 Daniel P. Hanley (born 1955), American film editor
 Danny Hanley (born 1974), English football goalkeeper
 Dick Hanley (American football) (1894–1970), American football player and coach
 Dick Hanley (swimmer) (born 1936), American swimmer
 Edward Hanley (state cabinet secretary) (1928–2007), American government official
 Edward T. Hanley (1932–2000), American labour activist and union president
 Ellen Hanley (1926–2007), American musical theater performer
 Ellery Hanley (born 1961), English rugby league player
 Eugene Hanley (1926–2009), American labor leader
 Finian Hanley (born 1985), Irish Gaelic footballer
 Frank Hanley (1909–2006), Canadian politician
 Geoffrey Hanley (born 1972), Kittitian politician
 Gerald Hanley (1916–1992), English novelist and travel writer
 Grant Hanley (born 1991), Scottish footballer
 James Hanley (1847–1916), Irish-born American railroad man and politician
 James Hanley (hurler) (1877–1915), Irish hurler
 James Hanley (novelist) (1897–1985), English novelist and playwright
 James Hanley (painter) (born 1965), Irish painter and designer
 James F. Hanley (1892–1942), American songwriter
 James M. Hanley  (1920–2003), American politician
 Jenny Hanley  (born 1947), English actress
 Jeremy Hanley (born 1945), British politician
 Jim Hanley (1885–1961), American baseball pitcher
 Jimmy Hanley (1918–1970), British actor
 Joe R. Hanley (1876–1961), American lawyer and politician
 John C. Hanley, American army officer
 Junior Hanley (born 1944), Canadian stock car driver and race car builder
 Katherine Hanley  (born 1943), American politician
 Kay Hanley (born 1968), American musician
 Leo B. Hanley (1908–1994), American jurist
 Lynne Hanley (born 1943), American feminist author and literary critic
 Martin Hanley (1918–2000), South African cricketer
 Michael Hanley (1918–2001), English director-general of MI5
 Pat Hanley (1896–1966), American college football head coach
 Paul Hanley (musician) (born 1964), British musician
 Paul J. Hanley (born 1949)  American Hospitality Industry executive
 Paul Hanley (tennis) (born 1977), Australian tennis player
 Pearce Hanley (born 1988), Irish Australian-rules footballer
 Quincy Hanley (born 1986), professionally known as Schoolboy Q, American rapper
 Raheem Hanley (born 1994), English footballer
 Richard Hanley, Zambian-born Australian philosopher
 Roberta Hanley, American actor and movie director
 Robin Hanley (1968–1996), English cricketer
 Rupert Hanley (born 1952), South African cricketer
 Steve Hanley (musician) (born 1959), English musician
 Steve Hanley (rugby union) (born 1979), English rugby footballer
 Susan Hanley (born 1939), American academic, author, Japanologist and historian
 Sylvanus Charles Thorp Hanley (1819–1899), British biologist
 Thomas J. Hanley Jr. (1893–1969), United States Air Force general
 Tim Hanley (born 1960), American soccer goalkeeper
 Trés Hanley, American and British actress and singer
 Val Hanley, Irish politician
 Victoria Hanley, American young adult fantasy novelist
 Vincent Hanley (1954–1987), Irish radio DJ and television presenter
 Will Hanley (born 1990), Irish-American professional basketball player
 William Hanley (born 1931), American playwright, novelist, and scriptwriter

Given name
 Robert Hugh Hanley Baird (1855–1934), Northern Irish newspaper proprietor
 Alec Hanley Bemis, American writer and manager for creative cultural projects
 Earl Hanley Beshlin (1870–1971), American politician
 Hanley Frias (born 1973), Dominican baseball player
 Hanley Funderburk (1931–2012), American academic administrator
 Robert Hanley Hall (1850–1924), Irish-born Canadian fur trader and politician
 Hanley Ramírez (born 1983), Dominican baseball player
 Frederick Hanley Seares (1873–1964), American astronomer
 Hanley Stafford (1899–1968) (born Alfred John Austin), English radio actor
 William Edward Hanley Stanner (1905–1981), Australian anthropologist

Fictional characters
 Paul Hanley, a character in the TV series Peyton Place

See also
Hanly